Law enforcement in Åland is the responsibility of the Police Authority of the Åland Islands, a unit independent of the mainland Finnish National Police (as per the Act on the Autonomy of Åland, 1991), which answers to the Åland unit of the
National Bureau of Investigation, part of the Government of Åland (the Landskapsregering).

The police officers do, however, wear the same uniform as on the mainland, and the police cars have the same paint scheme. But all markings on uniforms or cars are in Swedish only. The police officers also receive their training in the same police academy as the police in mainland Finland.

Ranks

The rank insignia are the same as for the equivalent rank in the national police, except that the Finnish Lion is replaced by the Stag of Åland.

References

External links
Official website

Aland
Government of Åland
Enforcement